Negre were a Montenegrin girl band, consisting of Jelena Kažanegra, Milena Vučić and Nina Žižić. They competed in the Serbo-Montenegrin Eurovision Song Contest preselection Evropesma 2004 in Belgrade, where they won the 3rd place. Later that year they won the 3rd place on Sunčane Skale Festival in Montenegro. Soon after that, Nina Žižić left the band. She was temporary replaced by Marija Brajović, but the band soon fell apart. All of the former members are now successful solo artists in Montenegro.

External links 

 Technical difficulties at the 2005 New Year's program on RTCG
 "K'o Nijedna Druga" - live at Evropesma

Montenegrin musical groups